The Orion 27-2, also called the Orion 27 Mk II, is an American sailboat that was designed by Henry Mohrschladt as a cruiser and first built in 1981.

The design is a development of the Orion 27, with a longer cabin coach house roof to allow for the installation of an extra set of portlights.

Production
The design was built by Pacific Seacraft from 1981 until 1993, but it is now out of production.

Design
The Orion 27-2 is a recreational keelboat, built predominantly of plywood-cored fiberglass, with teak wood trim. It has an optional cutter rig as a sloop or a yawl, a raked stem, an angled transom, a keel-mounted rudder controlled by a wheel and a fixed long keel, with a cutaway forefoot. It displaces  and carries  of ballast. A yawl rig was optional. The hull cross-section is a traditional "wineglass" shape.

The fuel tank holds .

The boat has two interior configurations. The first has a "U"-shaped dinette table and a navigation station aft of the dinette. The second layout is intended for longer-ranged cruising and has a smaller dinette table, which makes room for a wet locker at the foot of the companionway stairs. Space in the bow can be used for stowage or an optional cabin heater. In both configurations the galley is located on the starboard  side of the cabin. There is a "V"-berth in the bow. The head is equipped with a shower, has a privacy door and is located forward, just aft of the bow "V"-berth. Additional sleeping space is provided by quarter berth in the cabin.

The deck has teak capped bulwarks. Ventilation is provided by a cabin hatch, two dorade vents and ten opening and screened ports.

The boat has two genoa winches and two winches for the halyards. The mainsheet traveler is mounted on the coach house roof.

Operational history
The boat is supported by an active class club, the Pacific Seacraft Orion 27 Club.

A review in Blue Water Boats, described the design as, "beautiful, strong, and capable". The review went on to say, "unsurprisingly for a Mohrschladt design, the Orion 27 has conservative lines. Under the waterline is a long keel with a forefoot cutaway to improve nimbleness and reduce wetted area. The sections carry the tried and true wine-glass shape. Don’t expect record setting pace with this kind of shape; think strong, safe, and good manners for heaving-to in the rough."

See also
List of sailing boat types

Similar sailboats
Aloha 27
Cal 27
Cal 2-27
Cal 3-27
C&C 27
Crown 28
CS 27
Edel 820
Express 27
Fantasia 27
Halman Horizon
Hotfoot 27
Hullmaster 27
Irwin 27 
Island Packet 27
Mirage 27 (Perry)
Mirage 27 (Schmidt)
Mirage 275
O'Day 272
Watkins 27
Watkins 27P

References

Keelboats
1980s sailboat type designs
Sailing yachts
Sailboat type designs by Henry Mohrschladt
Sailboat types built by Pacific Seacraft